Somogy may refer to:

Somogy County, an administrative county (comitatus or megye) in present Hungary
Somogy County (former), historic administrative county (comitatus) of the Kingdom of Hungary

See also 
Somogy-Csurgó
Somogyi